Charles Myers Jr. (March 21, 1925 – May 9, 2016) was an aviation pioneer and an early member of the "Fighter Mafia" inside the Pentagon. He served as the Director for Air Warfare in the Office of the Secretary of Defense between 1973-78 during which time he launched Project Harvey which later became known as the “stealth” program.

References

External links

1925 births
2016 deaths
Aircraft designers
American test pilots
Lafayette College alumni
Military strategists
Military theorists
People from Phillipsburg, New Jersey
United States Army Air Forces bomber pilots of World War II
United States Navy personnel of the Korean War
United States Air Force reservists
Military personnel from New Jersey